Radvilas Kasimiras Gorauskas (3 February 1941 – 1983) was a Brazilian basketball player. He competed in the men's tournament at the 1972 Summer Olympics.

References

1941 births
1983 deaths
Brazilian men's basketball players
Olympic basketball players of Brazil
Basketball players at the 1972 Summer Olympics
Place of birth missing
20th-century Brazilian people